Takhta is the name of several rural area localities in Russia:
Takhta, Khabarovsk Krai, a selo in Ulchsky District of Khabarovsk Krai
Takhta, Stavropol Krai, a selo in Takhtinsky Selsoviet of Ipatovsky District of Stavropol Krai